
Lidzbark County is a unit of territorial administration and local government (powiat) in Warmian-Masurian Voivodeship, northern Poland.

As of 2006 its total population is 43,006, out of which the population of Lidzbark Warmiński is 16,390, that of Orneta is 9,380, and the rural population is 17,236.

History
Lidzbark County came into being on January 1, 1999, as a result of the Polish local government reforms passed in 1998.

Neighbouring counties
Lidzbark County is bordered by Bartoszyce County to the north-east, Olsztyn County to the south, Ostróda County to the south-west, and Elbląg County and Braniewo County to the west.

Administrative division
The county is subdivided into five gminas (one urban, one urban-rural and three rural). These are listed in the following table, in descending order of population.

References
Polish official population figures 2006

 
Lidzbark